The Palm Sunday massacre was a 1984 mass-murder in Brooklyn, New York, that resulted in the deaths of ten people: two women, two teenage girls, and six children. There was one survivor, an infant girl.

Murders 
All of the victims were shot, with a total of 19 bullets fired from two handguns at close range, most in the head, and were found in relaxed poses sitting in couches and chairs, suggesting that they had been taken by surprise. There were no signs of drugs or robbery at the home.  

In 1985, Christopher Thomas was convicted on ten counts of manslaughter, but was cleared of murder charges. The jury had convicted him of intentional murder, but the charges were reduced due to "extreme emotional disturbance" and Thomas being high on drugs. Prosecutors said the motive was jealousy, claiming Thomas suspected his wife of having an affair with the home's owner, a convicted cocaine dealer named Enrique Bermudez. Thomas's wife testified her husband was "enraged" over finding her at the Bermudez residence without him and set fire to his and her shared residence when she told him she was leaving him. Bermudez claimed Thomas had once asked Bermudez to have sex with Thomas's wife, but Bermudez declined.

Other witnesses testified they had seen Thomas “looking bizarre” in or near the residence earlier on the day of the murders. Bermudez confirmed this, saying Thomas had visited him that morning asking for drugs and cash. When Bermudez asked about some $9,000 Thomas already owed him, Thomas reportedly promised a surprise.

Thomas was sentenced to from 83 to 250 years, but due to state law was expected to spend no more than 50 years in prison.  He ended up serving just over 32 years before being released in 2018, having served two thirds of the maximum fifty years allowed by New York State.

The sole survivor, an infant female, was raised by her grandmother. Joanne Jaffe, at the time a "beat cop" and by 2014 the highest ranking female officer in the New York City Police Department, was assigned to the infant girl, and stayed in contact with her as she grew up. The girl lived with Jaffe starting at age 14. In 2014, after the death of the girl's grandmother, Jaffe adopted her at the age of 31.

On January 2, 2018, he was released from prison at age 68, after serving two thirds of a 50 year sentence.

List of victims
 Betsy Bermudez, age 14 – sister of Marelyn Bermudez and daughter of homeowner Enrique Bermudez
 Marelyn Bermudez, age 10 – sister of Betsy Bermudez and daughter of homeowner Enrique Bermudez
 Eddie Lopez, age 7 – son of Virginia Lopez and brother of Juan Enrique Lopez
 Juan Enrique Lopez, age 4 – son of Virginia Lopez and brother of Eddie Lopez
 Virginia Lopez, age 24 – mother of Eddie and Juan Enrique Lopez. She was also the girlfriend of homeowner Enrique Bermudez and was eight months pregnant with their child at the time of her murder.
 Alberto Maldonado, age 3 – son of Carmen Perez and brother of Noel Maldonado and half-brother of Christina Rivera, the sole survivor of the massacre.
 Noel Maldonado, age 3 – son of Carmen Perez and brother of Alberto Maldonado and half-brother of Christina Rivera, the sole survivor of the massacre.
 Carmen Perez, age 20 – mother of Alberto and Noel Maldonado and Christina Rivera, the sole survivor of the massacre and sister of Migdalia Perez.
 Maria Isabel Perez, age 10 – niece of Carmen and Migdalia Perez
 Migdalia Perez, age 14 – sister of Carmen Perez and aunt of Alberto and Noel Maldonado and Christina Rivera.

See also 
List of massacres in the United States
List of shootings in New York
Mass shootings in the United States
List of longest prison sentences
List of disasters in New York City by death toll
List of rampage killers

References

External links
Palm Sunday Massacre Victims at Find A Grave

1984 murders in the United States
1984 mass shootings in the United States
Massacres in 1984
Massacres in the United States
Crimes in Brooklyn
Familicides
1984 in New York City
April 1984 events in the United States
Mass murder in the United States
Mass shootings in the United States
Mass shootings in New York City